Polichinelle is French for the Commedia dell'arte character Pulcinella.

It may also refer to:
Polichinelle (album), 2001 The Prayer Boat album
"Polichinelle", 1962 Edith Piaf song from album Les Amants De Teruel
"Polichinelle", a 1967 song by the French singer France Gall
Polichinelle, a band whose members include Bubu and Serafina Ouistiti
"Polichinelle", a piece for solo piano by Sergei Rachmaninoff, Morceaux de fantaisie (1892) Op. 3, No. 4.
Polichinelle, the little children or clowns in The Nutcracker ballet who emerge from Mother Ginger's enormous hoop skirt to do a short dance
Polichinelle Couloir near La Grave, France where the American extreme skier Doug Coombs died in a fall.
"Polichinelle", a 2012 cover by the Symphonic Metal band Therion